Spinachitina is an extinct genus of chitinozoans. It was described by Schallreuter in 1963.

Species
 Spinachitina cervicornis (Eisenack, 1931)
 Spinachitina coronata (Eisenack, 1931)
 Spinachitina fragilis (Nestor, 1980)
 Spinachitina maennili (Nestor, 1980)
 Spinachitina multiradiata (Eisenack, 1959)
 Spinachitina suecica (Laufeld, 1967)
 Spinachitina taugourdeaui (Eisenack, 1968)
 Spinachitina tvaerensis Grahn, Nõlvak et Paris, 1996

References

Prehistoric marine animals
Fossil taxa described in 1963